In particle physics, the hypercharge (a portmanteau of hyperonic and charge) Y of a particle is a quantum number conserved under the strong interaction. The concept of hypercharge provides a single charge operator that accounts for properties of isospin, electric charge, and flavour. The hypercharge is useful to classify hadrons; the similarly named weak hypercharge has an analogous role in the electroweak interaction.

Definition
Hypercharge is one of two quantum numbers of the SU(3) model of hadrons, alongside isospin . The isospin alone was sufficient for two quark flavours — namely  and  — whereas presently 6 flavours of quarks are known.

Mathematically, hypercharge is

Strong interactions conserve hypercharge (and weak hypercharge), but weak interactions do not.

Relation with electric charge and isospin

The Gell-Mann–Nishijima formula relates isospin and electric charge

where I3 is the third component of isospin and Q is the particle's charge. 

Isospin creates multiplets of particles whose average charge is related to the hypercharge by:

since the hypercharge is the same for all members of a multiplet, and the average of the I3 values is 0.

SU(3) model in relation to hypercharge
The SU(2) model has multiplets characterized by a quantum number J, which is the total angular momentum. Each multiplet consists of  substates with equally-spaced values of Jz, forming a symmetric arrangement seen in atomic spectra and isospin. This formalizes the observation that certain strong baryon decays were not observed, leading to the prediction of the mass, strangeness and charge of the  baryon.

The SU(3) has supermultiplets containing SU(2) multiplets. SU(3) now needs two numbers to specify all its sub-states which are denoted by λ1 and λ2.

 specifies the number of points in the topmost side of the hexagon while  specifies the number of points on the bottom side.

Examples
From the Gell-Mann–Nishijima formula we know that proton has isospin  while neutron has 

Practical obsolescence
Hypercharge was a concept developed in the 1960s, to organize groups of particles in the "particle zoo" and to develop ad hoc conservation laws based on their observed transformations. With the advent of the quark model, it is now obvious that strong hypercharge, is the following combination of the numbers of up (), down (), strange (), charm (), top () and bottom ():

In modern descriptions of hadron interaction, it has become more obvious to draw Feynman diagrams that trace through the individual constituent quarks (which are conserved) composing the interacting baryons and mesons, rather than bothering to count strong hypercharge quantum numbers. Weak hypercharge, however, remains an essential part of understanding the electroweak interaction.

References

Nuclear physics
Quarks
Standard Model
Electroweak theory

he:היפרמטען